Jackie Mason (born Yacov Moshe Maza; ; June 9, 1928 – July 24, 2021) was an American stand-up comedian and actor.

His 1986 one-man show The World According to Me! won a Special Tony Award, an Outer Critics Circle Award, an Ace Award, an Emmy Award, and earned a Grammy nomination. Later, his 1988 special Jackie Mason on Broadway won another Emmy Award (for outstanding writing) and another Ace Award, and his 1991 voice-over of Rabbi Hyman Krustofski in The Simpsons episode "Like Father, Like Clown" won Mason a third Emmy Award. He wrote and performed six one-man shows on Broadway.

Known for his delivery and voice, as well as his use of innuendo and pun, Mason's often culturally grounded humor was described as irreverent and sometimes politically incorrect.<ref name=autogenerated2>Zeke Jarvis (2015). Make 'em Laugh! American Humorists of the 20th and 21st Centuries: American Humorists of the 20th and 21st Centuries Make 'em Laugh! American Humorists of the 20th and 21st Centuries]</ref> A critic for Time magazine wrote that, throughout his career, Mason spoke to audiences: "... with the Yiddish locutions of an immigrant who just completed a course in English. By mail."

Early life
Jackie Mason was born Yacov Moshe Maza on June 9, 1928 (according to the 1940 NYC census), in Sheboygan, Wisconsin, the fourth and last son (and only son born in the United States) in a family of six children of strict Orthodox Jews. Mason came from a long line of rabbis, which included his father, his grandfather, his great-grandfather, and his great-great grandfather."A Mason by any Other Name," Jewish Book World (2006).

His father Eli Maza and his mother, Belle (Gitlin), were born in Minsk, and immigrated to the U.S. in the 1920s with the rest of Mason's family; his father died in 1959. A Jewish refugee organization helped his father find a position in Sheboygan, as it needed a rabbi. When Mason was five years old, his family moved to the Lower East Side of Manhattan in New York City, largely so that he and his siblings could pursue a yeshiva education, where he grew up on Henry Street, Rutgers Street, and Norfolk Street.Ken Gross (February 23, 1987). "Too Much of a Ham to Remain a Rabbi, Broadway's Jackie Mason is Now the Toast of the Town", People There, his parents and their friends all spoke Yiddish.

As a teenager, Mason worked as a busboy at resorts in the Borscht Belt in New York's Catskill Mountains. He recalled: "Twenty minutes, at the Pearl Lake Hotel. I broke all the dishes. They made me a lifeguard. 'But I can't swim', I told the owner. 'Don't tell the guests', he says."

In 1953 Mason graduated with a Bachelor of Arts degree in his double major of English and sociology from the City College of New York.Joseph Dorinson (2015), Kvetching and Shpritzing: Jewish Humor in American Popular Culture, McFarland At age 18 he became a cantor, and at age 25 he received semikhah from Rabbi Moshe Feinstein and was ordained a rabbi (as his three brothers, father, grandfather, and great-grandfather had been). He led congregations in Weldon, North Carolina, and at Beth Israel Congregation in Latrobe, Pennsylvania.Adam Reinherz. "End of an era; Soon all that will remain will be Beth Israel's history legacy", The Jewish Chronicle He said that in synagogue, "I started telling more and more jokes, and after a while, a lot of gentiles would come to the congregation just to hear the sermons." Three years later, after his father died, he resigned from his job as a rabbi in a synagogue to become a comedian because, he said, "Somebody in the family had to make a living.""All About ... Jackie Mason", Jackie Mason; The Official Site, Retrieved July 14, 2014

Career

Early years
Mason wrote most of his own material. A sampling of his humor is his commentary on doctors: "That's a great profession, a doctor. Where else can you ask a woman to get undressed and then send the bill to her husband?" And his commentary on what is important in life: "Money is not important. Love is important. Fortunately, I love money." As well as his ruminations on pleasing people: "You can't please everyone. I have a girlfriend. I think she's the most wonderful person in the world. That's to me. But to my wife ..."Aubrey J. Sher, The Stand-Up Comedy Festival: Send In The Clowns And on trust: "My grandfather always said that I shouldn't watch my money. That I should watch my health. So while I was watching my health, someone stole my money. It was my grandfather." And on fidelity: "Eighty percent of married men cheat in America. The rest cheat in Europe."

He was a comedian at the Fieldston Hotel in Swan Lake, New York, in the summer of 1955. Mason was let go because his act was considered too far ahead of its time. The patrons had not been exposed to a comic who seemed to be ridiculing them. A few years later, Don Rickles came along, but at that point audiences had become open to this type of humor throughout the Borscht Belt. He adopted his stage name after appearing on the Barry Gray radio show. He performed at New York City nightclubs (where he was earning as much as $10,000 ($ in current dollar terms) a week), and on The Steve Allen Show, his first national TV appearance, in 1962, and the Tonight Show with Steve Allen, as well as on The Perry Como Show, The Dean Martin Show, and The Garry Moore Show. The William Morris Agency advised him in 1962 to take elocution lessons so that he could shed his heavy Yiddish accent, but he refused.

Mason made several appearances as a guest on The Ed Sullivan Show during the 1960s. He claimed to have been on the episode which featured the American television debut of the Beatles, although research does not bear this fact out. Mason revealed during his appearance on the BBC show Desert Island Discs, in March 2012, that at the time he did not think much of the group, referring to them as "four kids in search of a voice who needed haircuts". In 1962 he came out with his initial LP record, a best-seller entitled I'm the Greatest Comedian in the World, Only Nobody Knows It Yet, followed by I Want to Leave You with the Words of a Great Comedian.Bob Rolontz (August 10, 1963)."Clay Talks a Nice Fight Disk," Billboard

In the Desert Island Discs interview, he also related how Frank Sinatra and a group of others once came to his show in Las Vegas and Sinatra started heckling his act. Mason made uncomplimentary comments to Sinatra until he "and his whole group" left. When asked whether he thought it was naïve to do that, given Sinatra's connections with "the Mob", Mason said, "No, I said to myself...what could they do me?" He went on to describe how shots were later fired into his room which cracked all the windows. The police did not pursue an investigation.

"Middle finger" incident (1964)
On October 18, 1964, in an appearance on The Ed Sullivan Show, Mason allegedly gave host Ed Sullivan the finger on air. Footage of the incident shows Mason in the middle of doing his stand-up comedy act and then looking toward Sullivan, who had placed himself directly behind the camera, commenting that Sullivan was signaling him. Sullivan was reportedly letting Mason know (by holding up two fingers) that he had only two minutes left, and to cut his act short, as the program was about to cut away due to having been partly pre-empted by an impromptu speech by President Lyndon B. Johnson that the show carried.

Mason began working his own fingers into his act to make fun of the situation and pointed toward Sullivan with an index finger, a thumb, but not, as Sullivan mistakenly believed, his middle finger. Sullivan was infuriated by this, and banned Mason from future appearances on the show, canceling Mason's six-appearance contract worth $45,000. Mason denied knowingly giving Sullivan the middle finger; he later said that he had not heard of the middle finger gesture at that time.

To clear his name, Mason filed a libel suit on the grounds that Sullivan had defamed him at the New York Supreme Court. That court dismissed most of Mason's complaint. Both Mason and Sullivan appealed to the New York Supreme Court Appellate Division (which reinstated three additional causes of action against Sullivan) in June 1966.Barry Avrich (2016). Moguls, Monsters, and Madmen: An Uncensored Life in Show Business

Mason was nevertheless banned from the show for a period of time. Sullivan asserted that Mason was unpredictable and could not be trusted. Because of Sullivan's influence, he was branded as unreliable, volatile, and obscene, and he failed to get substantial television work for the next two decades. 

Mason was given a single comeback appearance on Sullivan's television program two years later, and Sullivan publicly apologized to him, but the damage was done. At that time, Mason opened his monologue by saying, "It is a great thrill ... and a fantastic opportunity to see me in person again." Mason later appeared on the show five times: April 23, 1967; February 25, 1968; November 24, 1968; July 22, 1969; and August 31, 1969. Mason later said: "It took twenty years to overcome what happened in one minute".

1965–1985

In 1969, Mason made his Broadway theater debut as Jewish widower Nat Weiss in the comedy play A Teaspoon Every Four Hours, which he wrote with Mike Mortman. It held the Broadway record of 97 previews and closed after its official opening performance (a preview record succeeded by Spider-Man: Turn Off the Dark with its 182 previews prior to opening). He also appeared in the films The Jerk (1979) and History of the World, Part I (1981).

1986–2011
In 1986, Mason made a triumphant return to Broadway in the two-year run of The World According to Me! which ran for 367 performances in its first run and 203 performances in its second run at the Brooks Atkinson Theatre, his first of several one-man theatrical shows.Dan Dietz (2016). The Complete Book of 1990s Broadway Musicals It was well received both by critics and the public; Frank Rich, the sometimes harsh reviewer of The New York Times, wrote: "So sue me ... Mason was very, very funny". It won a Special Tony Award, an Outer Critics Circle Award, an Ace Award, an Emmy Award, and a Grammy nomination.Romi Oliverio (September 21, 2009). "Jackie Mason's One-Man Show, 'No Holds Barred', To Play Los Angeles' Wadsworth Theatre", Broadway World His special Jackie Mason on Broadway won an Emmy Award for outstanding writing and an Ace Award.

Mason starred in the movie Caddyshack II (1988), where his character had the same surname, Hartounian, as his character in The Jerk. In 1990 and 1991, Mason again was on Broadway, this time with his successful two-act show Brand New, which ran for 216 performances at the Neil Simon Theatre, and won him his second Outer Critics Circle Award. Critic Clive Barnes of the New York Post praised the "brilliant" comic and his "totally new from top to tuchis" humor. Critic Mel Gussow of The New York Times remarked on the "exact meeting" between performance and material in which Mason engaged in a comic attack on everyone, including himself, cutting them all down to size.

In 1992, Mason won a Primetime Emmy Award for Outstanding Voice-Over Performance for his voice-over of Rabbi Hyman Krustofski in The Simpsons episode "Like Father, Like Clown", making him the first guest star to win an Emmy for his role. Mason also appeared in The Simpsons episodes "Today I Am a Clown", "Once Upon a Time in Springfield", "The Ten-Per-Cent Solution", "At Long Last Leave", and "Clown in the Dumps"; the last episode focuses upon Rabbi Krustofski's death and its effects on his son, Krusty the Clown. The character would appear three more times in fantasy sequences/flashbacks in "The Nightmare After Krustmas", "Flanders' Ladder" and "Woo-Hoo Dunnit?" which was his final appearance in the series and final acting performance before his death in 2021.

One of his Broadway shows, his two-act Politically Incorrect (1994–95) ran for 347 performances at Broadway's John Golden Theater. Critic John Simon of Time wrote: "His method is hyperbole and reductio ad absurdum, but always informed by bitter reason. His irony is a spotlight illuminating our absurdities; his zingers are scalpels laying bare the sickness under the skin. There is a unifying thrust, a focus, a structure: an attack on both liberal hypocrisy and conservative apathy, and on the climate of political correctness that makes it impossible to attack anyone but WASPs. ... Mason is a true satirist in the mold of ... Mark Twain . ... " It was performed during the same period that Bill Maher's late-night, half-hour political TV talk show Politically Incorrect was on the air. Maher brought a lawsuit against Mason's production, which was dismissed as frivolous. Mason was able to use this show title, and it is one of his most successful road productions. Between these shows, Mason played the lead in a short-lived television interfaith sitcom called Chicken Soup alongside Lynn Redgrave.

Mason also put on the Broadway one-man shows Love thy Neighbor (1996–97) which ran for 225 performances at the Booth Theatre (critic Lawrence Van Gelder of The New York Times described Mason's routines as "roaringly funny"), Much Ado About Everything (1999–2000) which was nominated for a Laurence Olivier Award for Best Entertainment for its run in London) and ran for 183 performances at the John Golden Theatre (in this effort Van Gelder described Mason as "convulsing audiences"), Prune Danish (2002; nominated for a Tony Award for Best Special Theatrical Event), Jackie Mason: Freshly Squeezed (2005; for which he was nominated for a Drama Desk Award for Outstanding Solo Performance), and The Ultimate Jew (2008)."Just the Facts: List of 2003 Tony Award Winners", Playbill

In a 2005 poll to find the Comedian's Comedian, Mason was voted #43 among the top-50 comedy acts ever by fellow comedians and comedy insiders. He was also ranked #63 in "Comedy Central Presents: 100 Greatest Stand-Ups of All Time". He holds the record for the longest-running one-man show in Broadway history and the longest-running stand-up show in the history of London's West End.

His full-length courtroom dramedy motion picture One Angry Man was released in 2010 throughout the US and Canada. Mason's most recent film Jackie Goldberg: Private Dick (2011) was a direct-to-DVD production, released by FilmWorks Entertainment.

Political views
A longtime Democrat, Mason was a registered Republican by 2007. He had spoken out in defense of Donald Trump.

Mason was an admirer of Rabbi Meir Kahane. He openly endorsed Kahane's plan to pay Israeli Arabs unwilling to accept Israeli sovereignty to emigrate. He also served as the honored speaker at a fundraising event for a yeshiva founded by Kahane.

In an issue of the newspaper The Evening Star dated March 1, 1971, Jackie Mason was quoted as saying "Democratic principles shouldn't apply to Israel like they do to America".

In January 2001, Mason co-founded the organization One Jerusalem in response to the Oslo peace agreement. Its stated cause is "Maintaining a united Jerusalem as the un-divided capital of Israel."

Controversies
In 1991, Mason was criticized by African-American organizations including the NAACP, when he called New York City mayor David Dinkins "a fancy shvartze with a moustache"; Mason later apologized. In 2009, Mason referred to Barack Obama as a shvartze during one of his stand-up routines, which prompted members of the audience to walk out.

In 2003, Mason co-wrote an article that advised Israeli leaders to threaten the expulsion of Palestinians from Israel, the West Bank, and Gaza Strip. Mason and Raoul Felder wrote, "We have paralyzed ourselves by our sickening fear of World Opinion, which is why we find it impossible to face one simple fact: We will never win this war unless we immediately threaten to drive every Arab out of Israel if the killing doesn't stop."

On 2006, Mason filed a lawsuit against the group Jews for Jesus for using his likeness in a pamphlet. His image was used next to the tagline "Jackie Mason ... a Jew for Jesus!?" Mason said in court papers filed in New York: "While I have the utmost respect for people who practice the Christian faith, the fact is, as everyone knows, I am as Jewish as a Matzah ball or kosher salami." Mason asserted that the group was using his image and fame to gain attention and converts. The group responded to the suit by saying, "Shame on him for getting so upset about this." The lawsuit was settled in 2006, with Jews for Jesus apologizing.

In 2012, Mason said that a friend at the time, Kaoru Suzuki-McMullen, attacked him while leaving his apartment on West 57th Street in Manhattan. Suzuki-McMullen said she was attacked by Mason, but she was arrested. Both sides agreed to drop the matter and all charges were dropped against Suzuki-McMullen.

Personal life
On August 14, 1991, Mason married his then-37-year-old manager Jyll Rosenfeld.

Sheba Mason, born in 1985, is the daughter of Jackie Mason. She is also a comedian.

Death
Mason died on July 24, 2021, at Mt. Sinai Hospital in Manhattan after being hospitalized for over two weeks.

Many celebrities and other notable figures mourned Mason's death. Gilbert Gottfried called him "one of the best." Fox News personality Sean Hannity remarked that he was "irreverent, iconoclastic, funny, smart and a great American patriot." Actor Henry Winkler tweeted that Mason put on "truly one of the funniest shows I have ever seen .. ever .. thank you Jackie and now you get to make heaven laugh."

Works
Selected TV, film and radio roles
Source:The Ed Sullivan Show (1961–1968) – frequent guest appearancesArchived at Ghostarchive and the Wayback Machine: It's a Mad, Mad, Mad, Mad World – gas station attendantSleeper (1973) – Voice of robot tailor (uncredited)Archived at Ghostarchive and the Wayback Machine: The Stoolie (1974) – Roger Pitman
 The Jerk (1979) – Harry Hartounian
 History of the World, Part I (1981) – Jew #1

 Caddyshack II (1988) – Jack Hartounian
 Chicken Soup (1989) – Jackie Fisher 
 The Simpsons – Rabbi Hyman Krustofski in ten episodes:
 "Like Father, Like Clown" (1991)
 "Today I Am a Clown" (2003)
 "Once Upon a Time in Springfield" (2009)
 "Treehouse of Horror XXII" (2011)
 "The Ten-Per-Cent Solution" (2011)
 "At Long Last Leave" (2012)
 "Clown in the Dumps" (2014)
 "The Nightmare After Krustmas" (2016)
 "Flanders' Ladder" (2018)
 "Woo-Hoo Dunnit?" (2019)
 The Fairly OddParents episode "Beddy Bye/The Grass Is Greener" (2003) – Harvey Sandman a.k.a. The Sandman, a.k.a. The Mattress King
 The Hitchhiker's Guide to the Galaxy – The Quandary Phase (2005) – The East River Creature
 The Jackie Mason Show (2005–11) – Host (originally aired on CN8: The Comcast Network; repeats currently airing on JLTV)
 30 Rock episode "The Collection" (2007) – himself (small guest appearance)
 The Drinky Crow Show episode "Aspire" (2009) – Mort Cooper
 One Angry Man (2010) – Jackie Mason
 Jackie Goldberg: Private Dick/ Goldberg – P.I.  (2011) – Jackie Goldberg
 Answer Me This! Episode 206 (2012) – Jackie Mason
 Graham Norton BBC Radio 2 Show (2012) – Jackie Mason
 When Comedy Went to School (2013) – Jackie Mason

Television specialsJackie Mason On Location (1978)Jackie Mason's The World According to Me! (1988)An Audience with Jackie Mason (1990)Jackie Mason on Campus (1992)Jackie Mason at the London Palladium (1996)Jackie Mason: A Night at the Opera (2002)

One-man showsJackie Mason's The World According to Me! (1986–1988)Jackie Mason: Brand New (1990–1991)Jackie Mason: Politically Incorrect (1994–1995)Love Thy Neighbor (1996–1997)Much Ado About Everything (1999–2000)Jackie Mason: Prune Danish (2002–2003)Jackie Mason: Freshly Squeezed (2005–2006)Jackie Mason: The Ultimate Jew (2008)Jackie Mason: Fearless (2012)

Books
 Jackie Mason. Jackie Mason's America. Carol Publishing Group, 1983.
Jackie Mason. Jackie, Oy!: The Frank, Outrageously Funny Autobiography of Jackie Mason. Robson, 1988.
 Jackie Mason, Ira Berkow. How to Talk Jewish. Macmillan, 1991.
 Jackie Mason and Raoul Lionel Felder. Schmucks!: Our Favorite Fakes, Frauds, Lowlifes, Liars, the Armed and the Dangerous, and Good Guys Gone Bad. Harper Collins, 2009. 

Video blogging
Mason appeared in over 200 self-written video blog entries on YouTube, in which he gave his opinions on current events and politics. He also experimented with podcasting, and in February 2012 appeared on the cult British podcast Answer Me This!, to promote his West End stand-up show, Fearless.

Legacy
Mason received a special Tony Award in 1987 for The World According to Me!.

Mason won an Emmy Award for Outstanding Writing in a Variety or Music Program for his 1988 HBO special The World According to Me! (also known as Jackie Mason on Broadway). He also won a 1992 Emmy Award for Outstanding Voice-Over Performance for his role as Rabbi Krustofsky on The Simpsons, shared with five of the show's regular cast members.

In DePatie-Freleng Enterprises' animated cartoon series The Ant and the Aardvark, the Aardvark's voice was performed by John Byner as an imitation of Mason.

References

External links

 
 
 Official website archived at the Wayback Machine
 1987 KCRW Radio interview with Bob Claster
 2007 interview (transcription) on Air America Radio
 
 "The Jewish World According to Jackie Mason" March 2020 Jewish News'' article
 Jackie Mason at Find a Grave

Age controversies
1928 births
2021 deaths
20th-century American comedians
21st-century American comedians
American male stage actors
American male television actors
American people of Belarusian-Jewish descent
American Orthodox rabbis
American stand-up comedians
Angel Records artists
Burials at Beth David Cemetery
CableACE Award winners
City College of New York alumni
Columbia Records artists
Comedians from New York (state)
Jewish American male actors
Jewish American male comedians
Male actors from New York (state)
Male actors from Wisconsin
New York (state) Republicans
People from Sheboygan, Wisconsin
People from the Lower East Side
Primetime Emmy Award winners
Special Tony Award recipients
Verve Records artists
Warner Records artists
21st-century American Jews